Jafar Sharif-Imami (
17 June 1912 – 16 June 1998) was an Iranian politician who was prime minister from 1960 to 1961 and again in 1978. He was a cabinet minister, president of the Iranian Senate, president of the Pahlavi Foundation and the president of the Iran chamber of industries and mines during the reign of Shah Mohammad Reza Pahlavi.

Early life and education

Sharif-Emami was born in Tehran on 17 June 1912 to a clerical family and his father was a mullah. After high school, Sharif-Emami was sent (along with thirty other young men) to Germany where he studied for eighteen months, returning to Iran in 1930 to work with state railroad organization until the Anglo-Soviet Invasion. Years later he was sent to Sweden for technical training, returning in 1939 when he received a degree in engineering.

Career and activities
Sharif-Emami began his career at the Iranian state railways in 1931. Arrested in summer of 1943 for alleged ties to Germany he was kept in detention along with many other members of Iran's elite. After his release he was appointed director-general of the Irrigation Agency. In 1950, he was appointed undersecretary of roads and communications. Prime Minister and General Haj Ali Razmara appointed him acting minister and then minister of roads to his cabinet inaugurated in June 1950, his first cabinet post.

He served as the minister of industries and mines in Manuchehr Eqbal's cabinet. He was prime minister from 1960 to 1961, and again in 1978, a few months before the overthrow of the Shah. He was appointed prime minister by Shah on 27 August 1978 because of his ties to clergy. Sharif-Emami succeeded Jamshid Amouzegar in the post. Sharif-Emami resigned from the office on 5 November 1978 and was replaced by Gholam Reza Azhari in the post. 

During his short tenure, he undid many of the Shah's plans including the closing of casinos, abandoning the Imperial calendar, abolishing the Rastakhiz Party and allowing all political parties to be active and personally responsible for preventing SAVAK to get involved and preventing the KGB backed clergyman from creating and continuing the 1979 revolution. All of his efforts to reform the political system in Iran, was overshadowed by the Black Friday massacre in Jaleh Square on 8 September 1978, mass protests, martial law and nationwide strikes, which brought the country's economy to its knees. He resigned from office amid riots on 5 November 1978. 

Sharif-Emami was also long-time president of the Iranian Senate and chairman of the Pahlavi Foundation. He was one of the close confidants of the Shah.

Personal life
Sharif-Emami was married and had three children, two daughters and a son.

For some years he was also the Grand Master of the Freemason Grand Lodge of Iran, which gave him some informal influence among Iran's political elite.

Later years and death
Sharif-Emami left Iran following the Islamic revolution in 1979. He settled in the Upper East Side of Manhattan, New York City. There he served as the president of the Pahlavi Foundation and later resigned from the post. He died at a hospital on 16 June 1998, one day shy of his 86th birthday, in New York City. He was buried in Valhalla, New York.

See also
 List of Iranian senators

References

External links

20th-century Iranian engineers
20th-century Iranian politicians
1912 births
1998 deaths
Exiles of the Iranian Revolution in the United States
Foreign ministers of Iran
Government ministers of Iran
Grand Crosses 1st class of the Order of Merit of the Federal Republic of Germany
Iranian emigrants to the United States
Iranian expatriates in Sweden
Iranian expatriates in Germany
Iranian Freemasons
Nationalists’ Party politicians
People of the Iranian Revolution
Politicians from Tehran
Presidents of the Senate of Iran
Prime Ministers of Iran
Rastakhiz Party politicians